The Liberal Pupils and Students Movement (MEEL) is the student wing of the Senegalese Democratic Party (PDS).

References

Student wings of political parties in Senegal
Student political organizations
Student wings of liberal parties